Louis George Anthony Salvas (17 August 1921 – 2 February 2005) was an Australian rules footballer who played with Hawthorn in the Victorian Football League (VFL).

Notes

External links 

Lou Salvas's playing statistics from The VFA Project

1921 births
2005 deaths
Australian rules footballers from Melbourne
Hawthorn Football Club players
Williamstown Football Club players
People from Williamstown, Victoria